A Girl at Bay is a lost 1919 silent film drama directed by Tom Mills and starring Corinne Griffith. It was produced and distributed by the Vitagraph Company of America.

Cast
Corinne Griffith -
Walter Miller - Bruce Craigin
Harry Davenport - Frank Galt
Denton Vane - Thomas Gray
Walter Horton - Detective Hooker

References

External links
 A Girl at Bay at IMDb.com

1919 films
American silent feature films
Lost American films
Vitagraph Studios films
American black-and-white films
Silent American drama films
1919 drama films
1919 lost films
Lost drama films
1910s American films